Cabal is a Spanish and French surname. Notable people with the surname include:

Juan Sebastián Cabal (born 1986), Colombian tennis player
Mariano Cabal (1830–1885), governor of the province of Santa Fe, Argentina between 9 April 1886 and 7 April 1871
Raymond Cabal (1888–?), French wrestler

French-language surnames
Spanish-language surnames